The Battle of Asal Uttar (Hindi : आसल उत्ताड़ , Punjabi: ਆਸਲ ਉਤਾੜ) was one of the largest tank battles fought during the Indo-Pakistani War of 1965. It was fought from 8 to 10 September 1965, when the Pakistan Army thrust its tanks and infantry into Indian territory, capturing the Indian town of Khem Karan 5 km from the International Border.<ref name=pradhan>{{cite book|last=R.D. Pradhan & Yashwantrao Balwantrao Chavan|title=1965 War, the Inside Story: Defence Minister Y.B. Chavan's Diary of India-Pakistan War.|year=2007|publisher=Atlantic Publishers & Distributors|isbn=978-81-269-0762-5|page=47|url=https://books.google.com/books?id=ymYCJQjEGBUC&pg=PA47}}</ref> The Indian troops retaliated, and after three days of bitter fighting, the battle ended with the Pakistani forces being repulsed near Asal Uttar. Factors that contributed to this were the fierce fight put up by the Indian Army, conditions of the plains, better Indian tactics, and a successful Indian strategy.

This battle is compared with the Battle of Kursk in the Second World War for how it changed the course of the India-Pakistan war of 1965 in India's favour. War historians, including Dr. Philip Towle, regard the Indian resistance near Khem Karan as one of the key turning points of the war, one which tilted the balance of the war in favour of India. Peter Wilson states that the defeat of the Pakistan Army in the battle of Asal Uttar was one of the greatest defeats suffered by Pakistani forces in the course of the Indo-Pakistan war of 1965.

 Battle 

The battle is described as one of the largest tank battles in history since the Battle of Kursk in World War II. Pakistan's invading force, consisting of the 1st Armoured Division and 11th Infantry Division, crossed the International Border and captured the Indian town of Khem Karan. Considering the situation, GOC Indian 4th Mountain Division (Maj. Gen. Gurbaksh Singh) immediately ordered the division to fall back and assume a horseshoe shaped defensive position with Asal Uttar as its focal point. The battle strategy was the brainchild of Brigadier Thomas K. Theogaraj.http://www.bharat-rakshak.com/ARMY/Galleries/Wars/1965/XI/0100.jpg.html

In the night, the Indian troops flooded the sugar cane field, and the next morning, the Pakistani tanks of the 1st Armoured Division, consisting mainly of M47 and M48 Patton tanks, were lured inside the horse-shoe trap. The swampy ground slowed the advance of the Pakistani tanks and many of them could not move because of the muddy slush. Over 100 Pakistani tanks mostly Pattons, and a few Shermans and Chaffees, were destroyed and another 40+ captured
while the Indians, by their account, lost only 10 tanks during this counter offensive.

 Conclusion 

Despite the initial thrust of the Pakistani Army into Indian territory, the battle ended in a decisive Indian Victory. The commander of Pakistani forces Maj. Gen. Nasir Ahmed Khan was killed in action.  According to military historian Steven Zaloga, Pakistan admitted that it lost 165 tanks during the 1965 war, more than half of which were knocked out during the "debacle" of Asal Uttar.

Pervez Musharraf, later Army Chief of Staff and President of Pakistan, participated in this battle as a lieutenant of artillery in the 16 (SP) Field Regiment, 1st Armoured Division Artillery. The battle also witnessed the personal bravery of an Indian soldier, Abdul Hamid, who was honoured with the Param Vir Chakra, India's highest military award, for knocking out seven enemy tanks with a recoilless gun.

This battle led to the creation of Patton Nagar (or "Patton City") at the site of the battle. This is because a large number of Patton tanks fielded by the Pakistani forces were either captured or destroyed at the scene.

 Battle Honour 
The honour Asal Uttar was awarded for the period 9 to 11 September to the following units-
 Deccan Horse
 3 Cavalry
 91 Mountain Regiment
 40 Medium Regiment
 4 Grenadiers
 18 Rajputana Rifles (now 11th Mechanised Infantry Regiment)
 1 Dogra (now 7th Mechanised Infantry Regiment)
 2 Mahar
 9 Jammu and Kashmir Rifles

 Published accounts 
 Documentaries Battle of Asal Uttar – Largest Tank Battle Since World War II'' (2018) is a TV documentary which premièred on Veer by Discovery Channel series, Mission & Wars.

Gallery

See also 
 Indo-Pakistan Wars
 Operation Grand Slam

Notes

References

Resources 
 1965 Official War History, Ministry of Defence, Government of India

External links 
 Pictures of the Patton Nagar

Asal Uttar
Indo-Pakistani War of 1965
Tarn Taran Sahib
1965 in India
Asal Uttar
Asal Uttar
History of Punjab, India (1947–present)
September 1965 events in Asia
Asal Uttar